The Southern Cross Catholic College (SCCC) is a co-educational Roman Catholic day school located in the suburb of Scarborough on the Redcliffe peninsula north-east of Brisbane in Queensland, Australia.

History
The college opened 30 January 1995 after the amalgamation of several schools on the Redcliffe Peninsula; in particular: De La Salle College - both the Junior and Secondary College (located on Scarborough Road), Frawley College (located on Scarborough Road), Soubirous College, St Bernadette's (Scarborough), Our Lady Help of Christians (Redcliffe) and Our Lady of Lourdes (Woody Point). The De La Salle campus (years 7 to 12), is located in Scarborough  and three primary schools (prep to year 6) are located in Scarborough, Woody Point and Kippa-Ring, respectively.

The previous Headmasters were Paul Woodcock, Robyn Killoran Greg Myers and Brett Horton, the current principal is Chris Campbell. The school is built on the old De La Salle College site.

Sport
The school currently participates in inter-school sport and is strong in futsal, volleyball, rugby league, basketball and Australian rules football.

Houses 

The school has four sporting and cultural house groups to which the students are assigned. They are:

Land development
Since the amalgamation in 1995, several developments have taken place involving land and buildings that previously were occupied by the college. The former site of Soubirous College and St Bernadette's of Scarborough (including the chapel) have since been developed into residential housing.

The lower ovals of the De La Salle Campus have been used for an expansion of an aged care facility that adjoins the school.

The site previously occupied by Frawley College was incorporated as part of the College in 1995 and became campus for the senior secondary students of Southern Cross Catholic College until it was developed in 2006 as the Australian Trade College North Brisbane.

Notable alumni

Petero Civoniceva – Penrith Panthers captain
Blake Cochrane – Australian Paralympic swimmer
Mick Crocker – Australian rugby league player
Jayden Hadler – Australian Olympic swimmer
David Hala – Brisbane Broncos player
Luke Howarth- Federal LNP Member for Petrie
Geoff Huegill – Australian Olympic swimmer
Ben Jones - former NRL Player with Canberra Raiders 
Leisel Jones – Australian Olympic swimmer
Michael Lavarch – Australian lawyer, educator and former politician
Linda Mackenzie – Australian Olympic swimmer
Kate McShea – Brisbane Roar FC W-League player
Clinton O'Brien – rugby league player, represented Queensland in the 1997 State of Origin
Sam Obst - former NRL Player with Sydney Roosters, ESL Player with Wakefield Trinity, Hull FC
Tracey Spicer – journalist
Ryan Phelan - television journalist, media personality and presenter
Tarnee White – Australian Olympic swimmer
Peta Wilson – actress, model

References

Catholic secondary schools in Brisbane
Educational institutions established in 1995
1995 establishments in Australia